Niranam Pally, popularly known as Niranam Valiya Pally or St. Mary's Orthodox Syrian Church, Kadapra, is a church under the Niranam Diocese of the Malankara Orthodox Syrian Church. It is believed that this church was one of the Church along with Jerusalem Marthoma Church, Niranam founded by Thomas the Apostle, one of the twelve Apostles of Jesus Christ, in AD 54.

History
Niranam Pally is one of the oldest churches in India. It is believed that the church was founded by St. Thomas, one of the twelve Apostles of Jesus Christ, in AD 54. The church was reconstructed several times since then. The stones in the church shows the reconstruction in 1259. St. Thomas, one of the twelve apostles of Jesus Christ landed at Malankara near Cranganore around A.D.52. He established seven and half churches. Those are, Kodugallore, Palayoor, Kottacave, Kokamangalam, Niranam, Chayal, Kollam and the half church at Thiruvithamkode. On his way from Kollam in northeast direction he arrived at Niranam "Thrikpapaleswaram" by sea.

It is believed to be one of the oldest churches in Kerala and thus in India as well as among the oldest ones in the world. The architecture shows striking similarities to ancient temple architecture. It is believed to have been established by St. Thomas. 

Before the headquarters of Malankara Metropolitans was permanently relocated to the Orthodox Theological Seminary, Kottayam in 1815, the Niranam Church also served as the thronal cathedral and headquarters of Malankara Metropolitans during multiple periods between 1653 and 1815.

Today
The present building, supposedly the fourth, was constructed in 1912 and was renovated during the year 2000. There are five altars at Niranam church. The main altar, the central one, is in the name of Saint Mary. This is used for regular services of the church.

There are two altars on the north and south of the main one. The altar on the northern side is consecrated to Saint George and the altar on the southern side is consecrated in the name of Mar Behnam.

There are two smaller altars, to the front of the main altar. The north among these is in the name of Saint Thomas. It is also the shrine of Mar Thoma II.Malankara Metropolitan of Malankara Orthodox Church

The southern among the small altars is consecrated to Saint Stephen. This is also the shrine of Mar Thoma V.

Granite cross
The tall granite cross at the right side of the entrance is a relic of the past, probably from 1259, the time at which the third renovation of the church building took place. The base of the cross has carvings resembling a Hindu Temple.

Feasts 
Niranam Church celebrate the feasts of Saint Mary in whose name the church is dedicated, the feast of Saint Thomas who is the founder of Malankara Orthodox Syrian Church and the Apostle of India and the feasts of Mar Thoma II and Mar Thoma V whose mortal remains are buried in the church.

 Feast of Assumption of Saint Mary (Vaangipu perunnaal in Malayalam or Shoonoyo in Syriac)  - 15 August
 Eight Day Lent of Saint Mary Mother of Jesus - September 1-8
 Feast of Martyrdom of Saint Thomas -  21 December
 Feast of Martyrdom of Mar Behnam - 27 December
 Feasts of Mar Thoma II and Mar Thoma V - 10 May

Image gallery

See also
 Malankara Orthodox Syrian Church
 Baselios Mar Thoma Paulose II
 Ezharappallikal

Notes

External links

 Website of Niranam Pally
  Website of the St. Thomas Chapel (A congregational wing (Prayer Group) of St. Mary’s Orthodox church, Niranam)
 Website of Malankara Orthodox Syrian Church
 Niranam Church Facebook page

Shrines to the Virgin Mary
Churches in Pathanamthitta district
Malankara Orthodox Syrian church buildings
Churches completed in 1912
20th-century churches in India
20th-century Oriental Orthodox church buildings
Ēḻarappaḷḷikaḷ